C S Yogananda  is a mathematician, currently serving as Professor of Mathematics at J.S.S Science and Technology University, Mysore. He is also an author and an entrepreneur. His writings of Mathematics have been published by many distinguished publications.

Mathematical Olympiads 
C S Yogananda has been involved with Mathematical Olympiad movement in India since 1989. He has participated as a resource person and evaluated answer books for various regional (RMO) and national (INMO) Olympiads.
He was also academic coordinator for the Problem Coordinators workshops organized by the National Board for Higher Mathematics.
He was member of the Core Faculty at the IMO Training Camps and involved in the selection of the Indian Team since 1989. He was a member of the Organizing Committee (Computer Committee / Publications Committee / Problem Selection Committee) when India hosted the IMO in July 1996 in Mumbai. During Yogananda's time as Observer and Deputy Leader for Indian team participating in IMO in the  years 1993, 1995 and 1998, India won 3 Gold, 10 Silver, 4 Bronze medals altogether.

Sriranga Digital Software Technologies

C S Yogananda established Sriranga Digital Software Technologies in 2003 with the primary intention of bringing digital technologies to the service of Indian languages. As a pioneering technological enterprise in the times of digital revolution it  addresses the need for powerful text formatting programs like TeX, LaTeX, Metafont, OCR for Kannada and also developing huge digital archives. Sriranga Digital Software Technologies takes to its credits for digitizing complete Rigveda Bhashya of Sri Sayanacharya that was first published under Sri Jayachamarajendra Grantharatnamala.

AdvaitaSharada 
C S Yogananda also created a digital archive of Sri Shankaracharya's works. The Advaita Sharada initiative has been recognized by the Jagadgurus of Sri Sringeri Sharada Peetham. The archive is a collection of Prasthanatraya Bhashya of Sri Shankara, his prakarana granthas and also the commentaries by later commentators of Sri Shankara. The archive tends to be a helping hand in understanding the works of Sri Shankara in more depth since it allows a complete search of the texts.

Honorary positions 

 Honorary Secretary, Leelavati Trust (Regd.), Bangalore.
 Honorary Joint Director, Jawaharlal Nehru Planetarium, Bangalore from November 1, 2000, to October 31, 2003.
 Member Secretary, Steering Committee for Informatics Olympiad.
 Chairman, TeX Users Group India (TUGIndia).

Further reading

 Editor: Ramanujan's papers, Prism Books
 Collected Papers of Srinivasa Ramanujan, Taylor & Francis
 Life and Times of Bourbaki – book review by Yogananda
 Echoes from Resonance (Number Theory) (jointly edited with S. A. Shirali) 
 Math Unlimited: Essays in Mathematics (edited by R. Sujatha, H. N. Ramaswamy, C. S. Yogananda)

References

External links
 DVK Murthy Prakashana
 Number Theory
 IMO 1998 list 

1960 births
Living people
Indian mathematicians